The Archaeological Museum in Zagreb, Croatia is an archaeological museum with over 450,000 varied artifacts and monuments, gathered from various sources but mostly from Croatia and in particular from the surroundings of Zagreb.

Its predecessor institution was the  "National Museum" in the Austrian Empire, open to the public since 1846. It was renamed to "State Institute of Croatia, Slavonia, and Dalmatia" in 1866. In 1878, the Archaeological Department became an independent institution within the State Institute, and the umbrella institute was dissolved in 1939, leaving the Archaeological Museum as a standalone institution. The archaeological collection of the State Institute had been kept in the Academy mansion at Zrinski Square from the 1880s and remained there until 1945, when the museum moved to its current location at the 19th-century Vranyczany-Hafner mansion, 19 Zrinski Square.

The museum consists of five main sections: Prehistory, Egypt, Antiquity, Middle Ages, Coins and Medals.

The section "Prehistory" contains 78,000 objects, ranging from the Paleolithic to the Late Iron Age. The section "Egypt" displays about 600 objects in the permanent exhibition. The section "Antiquity" contains an important collection of Greek vases (about 1,500 vessels) and stones with inscriptions. The Roman Antiquity is represented by many statues, military equipment, metal objects, Roman religion and art and objects from everyday life, acquired through systematic archaeological excavations in various Croatian regions in many Croatian cities founded during the Roman Empire. The numismatic section is among the largest collections of this type in Europe.

Some of the famous artifacts include:
Vučedol dove, a flagon shaped as a bird
Liber Linteus, 3rd century BCE mummy and bandages with the longest Etruscan inscription in existence
Lumbarda Psephisma, 4th century BCE stone inscription detailing the founding of an ancient Greek colony on the island of Korčula

As of 2021, the museum is closed pending repairs due to damage from the 2020 Zagreb earthquake.

Gallery

References

External links

 —

Zagreb
Museums in Zagreb
Donji grad, Zagreb
1846 establishments in the Austrian Empire
Museums established in 1846
Neoclassical architecture in Croatia